Kombo-Itindi is a commune and arrondissement in the Ndian département, Southwest Province, western Cameroon.

References
Ministry of Territorial Administration and Decentralization - Southwest province

Populated places in Southwest Region (Cameroon)